Mount Sherrill is a mountain located in Greene County, New York, and is named after Eliakim Sherrill, and is part of the Catskill Mountains.
Mount Sherrill is flanked to the east by North Dome, and to the west by Balsam Mountain.

Mount Sherrill stands within the watershed of the Hudson River, which drains into New York Bay. 
The northern slopes of Mt. Sherrill drain via Bennett Brook and Newton Brook into the West Kill, then into Schoharie Creek, the Mohawk River, and, finally, the Hudson River. 
The west side of Mt. Sherrill drains into Bushnellsville Creek, thence into Esopus Creek, and the Hudson River. The southeast side of Mt. Sherrill drains through Peck Hollow into Esopus Creek.

Mount Sherrill is contained within the Westkill Mountain Wilderness Area of New York's Catskill State Park. 
There is no hiking trail over the mountain, although an extension of the Devil's Path west from West Kill Mtn. has been contemplated.

See also 

 Catskill High Peaks
 List of mountains in New York

Notes

External links 
 Mount Sherrill Hiking Info. Catskill 3500 Club
  Peakbagger.com: Mount Sherrill
 

Mountains of Greene County, New York
Catskill High Peaks
Mountains of New York (state)